Novak Djokovic was the three-time defending champion and lost the final to Andy Murray by way of a walkover.

Seeds

Draw

Draw

Play-offs

References

World Tennis Championship
2015 in Emirati tennis